Park Cho-rong (born March 3, 1991), better known mononymously as Chorong, is a South Korean singer, songwriter and actress. She is best known as the leader of the South Korean girl group Apink.

Early life 
Park Cho-rong was born in Cheongju, North Chungcheong Province, South Korea on March 3, 1991. She is a middle child, having an older and a younger sister. As a daughter of a Hapkido master and academy owner, Park was trained in the said martial art for eight years. She trained from her first year in elementary school until her third year of junior high; she is a holder of a third degree black belt. During her school days, Park attended Byungsul Kindergarten, Bukang Elementary School, Bukang Middle High School, and Choongbook High School.

Park auditioned for JYP Entertainment fifth official audition in 2009 where she successfully made it to the final round. However, she was eventually eliminated and after that she joined Cube Entertainment as a trainee.

Career

2011–present: Apink 

In February 2011, Park was announced as the second member and leader of Apink. Prior to the announcement, she appeared at the end of Beast's "Shock" Japanese version music video. Before her debut with Apink, Park, together with the rest of the Apink members, took part in the filming of Apink News which was the group's pre-debut reality show. On April 19, 2011, Apink released its first single "Mollayo" and on April 21, Park debuted as a member of Apink on Mnet's M! Countdown performing their songs "Mollayo", and "Wishlist" which were included on their debut EP Seven Springs of Apink.

2011–present: Acting career 

Park started her acting career by appearing on the 2010 sitcom All My Love playing a character named Chorong, following the departure of Brown Eyed Girls' Gain. She then made a cameo appearance on Reply 1997 as the teenage version of Lee Il-Hwa, the mother of the lead role Sung Shi-won (played by Jung Eun-ji) along with her fellow Apink member Yoon Bo-mi. Park had her first leading role in the romantic comedy Plus Nine Boys as Han Soo-ah, a popular but mysterious high-school girl; a character opposite to BtoB's Yook Sungjae's character. In 2017, she starred on Naver TV Cast's web drama Special Law of Romance alongside Kim Min-kyu and VIXX's Hyuk.

Filmography

Film

Television series

Web series

Television shows

Web shows

References

External links 

  

1991 births
Living people
21st-century South Korean actresses
Apink members
Japanese-language singers of South Korea
K-pop singers
People from North Chungcheong Province
South Korean dance musicians
South Korean women pop singers
South Korean female idols
South Korean singer-songwriters
South Korean television actresses
IST Entertainment artists
21st-century South Korean singers
21st-century South Korean women singers
People from Cheongju
South Korean women singer-songwriters
South Korean hapkido practitioners